Ballybannon is a townland on the outskirts of the village of Annsborough close to the town of Castlewellan, County Down, Northern Ireland. The area is a wetland with two small areas of vegetation.

References 

Townlands of County Down
Civil parish of Kilmegan